Poświętne  is a village in Białystok County, Podlaskie Voivodeship, in north-eastern Poland. It is the seat of the gmina (administrative district) called Gmina Poświętne.

The village has an approximate population of 280.

References

Villages in Białystok County
Łomża Governorate
Białystok Voivodeship (1919–1939)
Belastok Region